Saw Thanda Dewi was queen consort to four consecutive of kings of Arakan. She was the chief queen of King Dikkha (r. 1554–56). She later became queen to King Saw Hla (r. 1556–64) and King Sekkya (1564–72), both of whom were her step-sons, and later to King Phalaung (r. 1572–93).

References

Bibliography
 

Queens consort of Mrauk-U
Chief queens consort of Mrauk-U
Burmese people of Rakhine descent